The 2006 Cologne Centurions season was the third season for the franchise in the NFL Europe League (NFLEL). The team was led by head coach David Duggan in his first year, and played its home games at RheinEnergieStadion in Cologne, Germany. They finished the regular season in fourth place with a record of four wins and six losses.

Offseason

Free agent draft

Personnel

Staff

Roster

Schedule

Standings

Game summaries

Week 1: at Hamburg Sea Devils

Week 2: vs Amsterdam Admirals

Week 3: vs Rhein Fire

Week 4: at Frankfurt Galaxy

Week 5: at Berlin Thunder

Week 6: vs Hamburg Sea Devils

Week 7: vs Frankfurt Galaxy

Week 8: at Amsterdam Admirals

Week 9: vs Berlin Thunder

Week 10: at Rhein Fire

Honors
After the completion of the regular season, the All-NFL Europe League team was selected by the NFLEL coaching staffs, members of a media panel and fans voting online at NFLEurope.com. Overall, Cologne had four players selected. The selections were:

 Philippe Gardent, linebacker
 Gabe Lindstrom, punter
 Erik Pears, guard
 Bryan Save, defensive tackle

Additionally, Gardent was named co-defensive MVP, sharing the award with Amsterdam Admirals' defensive tackle Tony Brown. The French, who was in his fourth season in the NFLEL and second with Cologne, became the first national player to win MVP honors after leading the league with 70 tackles.

Notes

References

Cologne
Cologne Centurions (NFL Europe) seasons